Laurier is the French word for the laurel plant, and is a francophone family name, common in Canada.

Sir Wilfrid Laurier (20 November 1841 – 17 February 1919) was the seventh Prime Minister of Canada from 11 July 1896 to 5 October 1911.  As Canada's first francophone prime minister, Laurier is often considered one of the country's greatest statesmen.

Laurier can also refer to:

People
 Laurier (name)
 Bénigne Basset Des Lauriers, early settler of New France, notary, surveyor
 Guerard des Lauriers, Catholic theologian and bishop

Politics
 Laurier Liberals, those Liberals (including Sir Wilfrid) who did not take part in the World War I-era coalition with the Conservatives
 Macdonald-Laurier Institute, a think-tank
 Laurier (electoral district), a former Canadian federal electoral district in Montreal
 Laurier (provincial electoral district), a former Quebec provincial electoral district in Montreal
 Laurier-Dorion, a Quebec provincial electoral district in Montreal
 Laurier—Sainte-Marie, Canadian federal electoral district in Montreal
 Laurier—Outremont, a former Quebec provincial electoral district in Montreal

Education
 Wilfrid Laurier University, in Waterloo, Ontario
Laurier Brantford, an affiliated campus from the University based in Waterloo
Wilfrid Laurier University Press, publishing house
Wilfrid Laurier University Students' Union
 Sir Wilfrid Laurier School Board in Southern Quebec
 Sir Wilfrid Laurier Secondary School, London, Ontario
 Sir Wilfrid Laurier Secondary School, Ottawa, Ontario
 Laurier Macdonald High School, Montreal
 Sir Wilfrid Laurier Elementary School, Vancouver
 Sir Wilfrid Laurier Public School, Brampton, Ontario
 Sir Wilfrid Laurier Collegiate Institute, Toronto
 Laurier Annex, Vancouver

Geographical places
 Laurier-Station, Quebec, a village
 Laurier, Washington, a community in Washington State on US 395 just south of the Canada–US border
 Laurier, Manitoba, an unincorporated community
 Rural Municipality of Laurier No. 38, Saskatchewan, a rural municipality
 Laurier Heights, Edmonton, a neighbourhood
 Mont-Laurier, a town in Quebec
 Mount Sir Wilfrid Laurier, in British Columbia
 Laurier, Ontario, a local services board
 Graham-Laurier Provincial Park, British Columbia

Transportation infrastructure
 Laurier Station (disambiguation) (several)
 Laurier, a Montreal Metro station
 Laurier Transitway Station, an OC Transpo Transitway BRT station
 Laurier station (Manitoba), a Via Rail station
 Laurier Avenue (disambiguation) (several)
 Laurier Avenue in Ottawa, Ontario, Canada
 Laurier Avenue, in Montreal, Quebec, Canada
 Rue Laurier, in Gatineau, Quebec, Canada
Laurier Bridge (disambiguation) (several)
 Laurier Avenue Bridge in Ottawa
 Laurier Railway Bridge in Montreal
Mont-Laurier Airport

Buildings and structures
 CCGS Sir Wilfrid Laurier, a ship
 Château Laurier, a hotel in Ottawa
 Esplanade Laurier, an office building in Ottawa
 Wilfrid Laurier Memorial, a monument in  Montreal
 Laurier House, a National Historic Site in Ottawa
 Laurier Québec, a shopping mall in Quebec City

Other
Laurier Palace Theatre fire, a 1927 fire in Montreal
Cyprès et lauriers, a musical composition by Camille Saint-Saëns
 Sir Laurier d'Arthabaska, a cheese
 Roman Catholic Diocese of Mont-Laurier, a religious see

See also 
Deloria, a Native American surname derived from Des Laurier